Benjamin Carl Oliver (born 24 October 1979 in Castlemaine, Victoria) is an Australian cricketer who has played for the Tasmanian Tigers and the Victorian Bushrangers. He is a right-arm fast-medium bowler, and big hitting lower-order batsman. Oliver has missed many opportunities through recurring bone injuries.

See also
 List of Victoria first-class cricketers
 List of Tasmanian representative cricketers

External links

1979 births
Living people
Australian cricketers
Tasmania cricketers
Victoria cricketers
Cricketers from Victoria (Australia)
People from Castlemaine, Victoria